Not So Much to Be Loved as to Love is an album by Jonathan Richman, released in 2004. The title is excerpted from Make Me an Instrument of Your Peace, "O Divine Master, grant that I may not so much seek ... to be loved, as to love."

The album contains two unlisted bonus tracks: "The Sea Was Calling Me Home" and an alternate version of the title track.

Track listing
All tracks composed by Jonathan Richman
"Not So Much to Be Loved as to Love" Version 1 – 2:53
"Sunday Afternoon" – 1:18
"Vincent Van Gogh" – 3:05
"Cosi Veloce" – 3:31
"He Gave Us the Wine to Taste" – 2:41
"Salvador Dali" – 2:22
"My Baby Love Love Loves Me" – 3:11
"In che mondo viviamo" – 2:26
"Behold the Lilies of the Field" – 3:07
"Les etoiles" – 2:14
"The World Is Showing Its Hand" – 2:24
"Abu Jamal" – 2:18
"On a du soleil" – 2:13
"The Sea Was Calling Me Home" – 2:06
"Not So Much to Be Loved as to Love" Version 2 – 2:46

Personnel
Jonathan Richman - vocals, guitar
Greg Keranen, Miles Montalbano - bass
Tommy Larkins - drums
Ralph Carney - brass, woodwind, percussion
Alison Faith-Levy, Chuck Prophet, Dave Sorrenson, Jenny Rae Richman, Liz Zoria, Nicole Montalbano, Roger Montalbano, Stephanie Finch, Susan Hertzfeld - backing vocals
Technical
Oliver Dicicco - engineer
Miles Montalbano - layout, design
Marty Crosley - cover photography

References

2004 albums
Jonathan Richman albums
Sanctuary Records albums
Vapor Records albums